Poul Erik Bech (15 March 1938 – 5 April 2014) was a Danish football manager. He won the 1984 Danish Championship with Vejle Boldklub and was awarded Manager of the Year the same year.

References

External links
DBU Profile

1938 births
2014 deaths
People from Fredericia
Danish football managers
Vejle Boldklub managers
Aarhus Gymnastikforening managers
FC Fredericia managers
Sportspeople from the Region of Southern Denmark